Feel the Need is the second studio album by American singer-actor Leif Garrett, released in 1978 by Scotti Brothers Records. The album peaked at number 34 on the Billboard 200 albums chart and spawned two hit singles: "I Was Made for Dancin'" (US No. 10) and "Feel the Need" (US No. 57).

Track listing

Personnel
John D'Andrea – arrangements
Humberto Gatica – engineer
 Michael Lloyd – engineer
David Larkham – art direction, design
Barry Levine – photography

Charts

Singles

Certifications

References

1978 albums
Albums produced by Michael Lloyd (music producer)
Leif Garrett albums
Scotti Brothers Records albums